Pennywise or Penny Wise may refer to:

 Pennywise (band), an American punk rock band
 Pennywise (album), a 1991 eponymous album by the band
 Pennywise the Dancing Clown, or It, the title character in the Stephen King novel It and its film and television adaptations
 Jon Vitti (born 1960), American screenwriter who used the pseudonym "Penny Wise"